Djondjon is the common name for a type of edible black mushroom often found in northern Haiti and used as a delicacy in some Haitian dishes, such as diri djondjon. The name is thought not to refer to a single species of mushroom, but is rather thought to be a colloquial name for several taxonomically distinct species. The mushrooms can be found on the marketplace in some western stores, though reportedly they are sold at high prices — Gene Yetter of the New Jersey Mycological Association and New York Mycological Society reported that he found them being sold dried in New York for around $1 USD for a quarter of an ounce.

Use in cooking
When cooked, djondjon mushrooms give the dish that they are in an "exquisite color, taste, and aroma." Before cooking, the inedible stems are removed and the caps are used. Djondjon are often served with rice and a meat such as pork, or fish. Boiling the mushrooms releases a grayish-black color into the water, which can then be used to flavor and color the rice they are served with, giving it a black color.  Dishes utilizing the mushroom are often served in Haiti on special occasions, such as birthdays, weddings, or on Christmas. Haitians living abroad will often seek out the mushroom for use in cooking in grocery stores located in areas with a large Haitian population, though sometimes they may use a flavored bouillon cube produced by the German company Maggi instead.

References 

Edible fungi
Haitian cuisine
Fungi of North America